The Eosentomidae are a family of hexapods in the order Protura. Eosentomids are tracheated, unlike the Acerentomidae.

Genera
These genera are members of the family Eosentomidae.
 Anisentomon Zhang & Yin, 1977
 Eosentomon Berlese, 1908
 Isoentomon Tuxen, 1975
 Madagascarentomon Nosek, 1978
 Neanisentomon Zhang & Yin, 1984
 Osientomon Nakamura, 2010
 Paranisentomon Zhang & Yin, 1984
 Pseudanisentomon Zhang & Yin, 1984
 Styletoentomon Copeland, 1978
 Zhongguohentomon Yin, 1979

References

Protura
Arthropod families